Garicano is a Basque surname. Notable people with the surname include:

Tomás Garicano Goñi (1919–1988), Spanish lawyer and politician
Luis Garicano (born 1967), Spanish economist

See also
Garitano

Basque-language surnames